The  Kai Nielsen House, situated at the corner of Krathusvej (No. 2) and Ørnekulsvej (formerly No. 14), is the former home of Danish sculptor Kai Nielsen in Ordrup north of Copenhagen, Denmark. It was completed in 1916 from a design by Ivar Bentsen. The house and associated studio was listed on the Danish registry of protected buildings and places in 1992.

History

Kai Nielsen and Ivar Bentson were personal friends. They collaborated on the design of Blågårds Plads in 19121915 and Nielsen painted a portrait of Bentson in 1913. The house at Krathusvej 2 in Ordrup Krat was built in 1914–16. Nielsen married his second wife Janna Lange Kielland Holm in July 1915. Their daughter Nina was born in 1917 and their son Yan was born in 1919. Kai Nielsen's atelier was located in part of the building. He died just 41 years old in 1924.

Architecture
The house is an example of the style known as Bedre Byggeskik. Ivar Bentsen was one of the leading figures of the Bedre Byggeskik movement. The style combined inspiration from traditional Danish architecture with inspiration from the Arts and Crafts movement and an emphasized the use of high quality building materials and craftmanship. The combination of yellow  brick walls, white-painted windows with shutters and a red tile roof is characteristic of the style. The house is a three-winged building. One of the two side wings contain Nielsen's atelier with double high ceilings, ultramarine blue walls and a window band that runs just below the ceiling. The wall colour is similar to that of the vestibule in Faaborg Museum. Nielsen had designed a large statue of Mads Rasmussen for the room. The wall colour of the atelier had been changed and the ceilings had been lowered but  the architectural firm Bertelsen & Scheving Arkitekter completed a restoration of the atelier in 2020.

See also
 Rågegården

References

External links

 Renderings in the Danish National Art Library
 Source

Houses in Gentofte Municipality
Artists' studios in Copenhagen
Listed buildings and structures in Gentofte Municipality
Houses completed in 1917
1916 establishments in Denmark